Earle Herrera (23 April 1949 – 19 December 2021) was a Venezuelan journalist and politician. He was elected to the 2017 Constituent National Assembly. On 4 September, Herrera, the president of a Constituency commission, resigned, alleging sectarianism during the election of the commission presidents, which he did not agree with. 

Herrera died on 19 December 2021, at the age of 72.

References

1949 births
2021 deaths
Venezuelan journalists
Members of the National Assembly (Venezuela)
Academic staff of the Central University of Venezuela
Central University of Venezuela alumni
United Socialist Party of Venezuela politicians
People from Anzoátegui
People of the Crisis in Venezuela
Death in Caracas
Members of the Venezuelan Constituent Assembly of 1999
Members of the Venezuelan Constituent Assembly of 2017